Angel is a 2009 Norwegian drama film directed by Margreth Olin. The film was selected as the Norwegian entry for the Best Foreign Language Film at the 83rd Academy Awards but it didn't make the final shortlist.

Cast
 Maria Bonnevie
 Börje Ahlstedt
 Antti Reini
 Lena Endre
 Gunilla Röör
 Benjamin Helstad

See also
 List of submissions to the 83rd Academy Awards for Best Foreign Language Film
 List of Norwegian submissions for the Academy Award for Best Foreign Language Film

References

External links

2009 films
2000s Norwegian-language films
Films directed by Margreth Olin
2009 drama films
Norwegian drama films
2009 directorial debut films